Six Articles can refer to
 Six Articles (1539), an early Church of England doctrinal statement affirming traditional Roman Catholic teaching
 The six articles of Islamic faith